The Belgian State Railways Type 2 was a class of  steam locomotives for passenger service, introduced in 1875.
Alfred Belpaire derived the locomotive design from the Type 28 by replacing the  wheels of the Type 28 with larger  diameter ones.

Construction history

The Type 2 was derived from the Type 28 by replacing the wheels of  diameter with lager  diameter wheels.
The machines used a Belpaire firebox and had an outside frame with the cylinders and the Stephenson valve gear located inside the frame.

In 1882 a number of Type 2 and Type 28 machines were rebuilt as  locomotives, resulting in 31 Type 2bis locomotives.
The rebuild was done by decoupling and swapping out the leading 1.7 m wheeled axle of a Type 2 with a 1.45 m wheeled axle of a Type 28 locomotive.

References

Bibliography

External links
 ETH-Bibliothek Zürich, Bildarchiv. Chemins de Fer de l‘Etat belge, No 1628, Type 2 bis, viewer

0-6-0 locomotives
Steam locomotives of Belgium
Standard gauge locomotives of Belgium
C n2 locomotives
Railway locomotives introduced in 1875
Cockerill locomotives
Franco-Belge locomotives